SOHS may refer to:

Highschools
 Sonora High School, La Habra, California, United States
 South Oldham High School, Crestwood, Kentucky, United States
 South Otago High School, Balclutha, New Zealand
 Stanford Online High School, Stanford, California

Other uses
 Secretary of Homeland Security, United States Department of Homeland Security
 Southern Oregon Historical Society, Jacksonville, Oregon, USA
 School of Health Sciences, University of Dar es Salaam, Dar es Salaam, Tanzania

See also

 
 SOH (disambiguation)